

Jip Jip Conservation Park (formerly the Jip Jip National Park) is a protected area in the Australian state of South Australia located in the state’s south-east in the gazetted locality of  Marcollat about  south-east of the state capital of Adelaide and about  north-east of the municipal seat of  Kingston SE.

The conservation park consists of land in section 86 in the cadastral unit of the Hundred of Peacock which is located on the northern side of Ballater Road, also known as the Kingston - Keith road. On 20 March 1967, it was proclaimed under the National Parks Act 1966 as Jip Jip National Park. On 27 April 1972, it was reconstituted as Jip Jip Conservation Park upon the proclamation of the National Parks and Wildlife Act 1972. The land includes Jip Jip Rocks, a local landmark consisting of granite outcrops and a “gently sloping hill”.

In 1980, it was described as follows: 
Jip Jip is best known for its granitic outcrops which are part of the Padthaway Rise.  However, the park also contains Asplenium flabellifolium which is an endangered fern and six other plant species which are rare in South Australia…  Over sixty species of birds have been recorded and one of the mammals recorded, Cercartetus lepidus (little pigmy possum), is uncommon in SA…  Jip Jip Conservation Park features granitic inselbergs surrounded by sandy swales and ridges.  The dominant plant community on the sandy areas is Eucalyptus baxteri/E. fasciculosa low open forest with heath understorey.  Smaller areas of E. fasciculosa/E. baxteri/E. diversifolia (open scrub) and Melaleuca gibbosa/Hakea rugosa (open heath) occupy the depressions.  Around the granitic outcrops Casuarina stricta is a prominent tree with the eucalypts and tall shrubs of Bursaria spinosa, Dodonaea viscosa, Melaleuca uncinata and Prostanthera behriana are common.  The park is relatively unmodified although it is a popular picnic spot.

As of 1992, visitors to the conservation park was “local residents for picnics, walking and viewing the granite outcrops, as well as by bird observers and field naturalists.”

The conservation park is classified as an IUCN Category III protected area.  In 1980, it was listed on the now-defunct Register of the National Estate.

See also
Protected areas of South Australia

References

External links
Webpage for the Jip Jip Conservation Park on the Protected Planet website

 Conservation parks of South Australia
Protected areas established in 1967
1967 establishments in Australia
South Australian places listed on the defunct Register of the National Estate
Limestone Coast